Meno Ektos (English title: I Still Remain An Outcast; Greek: Μένω Εκτός) is an album by popular Greek artist Eleftheria Arvanitaki. It was released in 1991 and it is her fourth personal album.  It went gold in Greece, selling over 50,000 copies; it spawned "Dinata" (Greek: Δυνατά), one of her signature songs. The lyrics of the album's songs, except Σαν Δεύτερη Φωνή (English title: Like a backing voice) and "Κύμα το κύμα" (English title: Wave after wave) who have been written by Thodoris Gonis and Yiorgos Zikas respectively, were written by Lina Nikolakopoulou; the music composers are Ara Dinkjian, Antonis Mitzelos, Christos Nikolopoulos, Zoran Simganovic, George Zikas and Nikos Xydakis.

Track listing 
 "Meno Ektos"
 "Kardia Mou Ego"
 "Prosopo Me Prosopo"
 "San Defteri Foni"
 "Kima To Kima"
 "Dinata"
 "Omorfi Mou Agapi"
 "Me To Idio Mako"
 "Kathrefti To Nou"
 "Tis Kalinihtas Ta Filia"
 "Den Apanta"

References

External links
Album page at Eleftheria Arvanitaki's official web-page.

1991 albums
Eleftheria Arvanitaki albums
Greek-language albums
Universal Music Greece albums